Tudela, officially the Municipality of Tudela,  (Cebuano: Lungsod sa Tudela; Tagalog: Bayan ng Tudela), is a 4th class municipality in the province of Misamis Occidental, Philippines. According to the 2020 census, it has a population of 28,599 people.

Tudela is widely known for its colorful and interesting Binalbal Festival, where many revelers are clad in very gory costumes like a giant Halloween costume party. It is held every New Year's Day (Jan. 1). Close to the border of Tudela is the eco-tourism attraction Misamis Occidental Aquamarine Park (MOAP), which is located in its boundary with Sinacaban, its neighboring town to the north.

History

Spanish colonial era 
Founded by Padre Antonio Olleta as the visita of Tudela and by 1884 it was already a pueblo with four barrios. Named after Tudela, Navarre, Spain, the hometown of Padre Olleta.

On December 28, 1920, during the American occupation, Governor General Francis Burton Harrison, through the efforts of Senator Jose F. Clarin, created the Municipality of Tudela through Executive Order No. 61 Series of 1920.

The first appointed Municipal President was Primitivo Ninang and its first Vice President was Pirigrin Sengidas. The following councilors appointed were Pio Adecir, Simeon Fuentes, Gregorio Madula, Casimeo Rubio, Julio Maliao, Florentino Olarte, Felix Codilla, and Isidro Sol.

The first appointed Municipal Secretary was Jose M. Castaños, known as “Secretario Municipal Interino”. The Provincial Fiscal nominated him and it was approved by Municipal Council Res. No. 123, series of 1923.

Spanish Language was used in the preparation of minutes, resolutions and ordinances from 1921 up to 1928 and in the later part of 1929 during the term of Ulpiano Balazo as Municipal President.

Martial law 

A notable incident in Tudela during the Marcos dictatorship took place on Aug. 24, 1981, when members of a pseudo-religious paramilitary sect strafed the house of the Gumapons, a Subanon family, in Sitio Gitason, Barrio Lampasan. Ten of the twelve persons in the house, including an infant, were killed.

Recent history 
In 1982 the 36 barangays of Tudela was reduced to 33, when 3 barangays (Tuno, Lalud, and Lampasan) were annexed to the newly created municipality of Don Mariano Marcos, Misamis Occidental (now the Municipality of Don Victoriano Chiongbian, Misamis Occidental).

Geography
Tudela is bounded on the north by the municipality of Sinacaban, to the south by the municipality of Clarin, to the east by Iligan Bay, and to the west by the municipality of Don Victoriano Chiongbian and Mount Malindang. It is 20-minute drive from Ozamiz City to the south, and 45-minutes drive from Oroquieta City to the north.

Climate

Barangays
Tudela is politically subdivided into 33 barangays.

Demographics

Religion
Places of worship:
San Isidro Labrador Parish Church (Roman Catholic) - Upper Centro
San Isidro Labrador Parish Church (Philippine Independent Church) - Centro Hulpa
United Church of Christ in the Philippines - Upper Centro
Kingdom Hall of Jehovah's Witnesses - Purok 1, Taguima
Seventh Day Adventist Church - Basirang; Nailon
Kristohanon (Church of Tudela) - Barra
Liberty Bible Baptist Church (Bible Baptist) - Taguima
Iglesia Filipina Independiente (IFI) - Hulpa
Church of the Back to Christ Royal Family in the 7th Millenium - Silongon

Economy

The majority hardly depends on agriculture and fishing. Commerce is also progressive in this municipality. There are many Tudelanhon businessmen. People in the municipality and of the neighboring barangays of Clarin and Sinacaban towns depend on the local market, instead of going to Ozamiz City, the economic hub in the province.

Crops: Palay, corn, banana, kamoteng-kahoy (cassava), sweet potato, coconut, fruits (mango, durian, lanzones), and vegetables.

Products: aquaculture products: shrimps, prawns, crabs, tilapia, bangus (milkfish); furniture; poultry products; breads and pastries; fishes and shells.

Tourism
Misamis Occidental Aquamarine Park: located along the mangroves of Tigdok and Libertad Bajo, baranggays of Tudela and Sinacaban, respectively - a wildlife park that serves as sanctuary for other endangered animals like the monkey-eating eagle and the tarsier, also found in the forests of nearby Mount Malindang National Park.
Binalbal Festival - every January 1, one of the oldest and longest running festival in the country as it traced back its origin as early the 1920s.
Araw ng Tudela - every December 28
Mount Malindang National Park
Barra Beach, Barra, Tudela, Misamis Occidental
Camarin Beach, Camarin, Cabol-anonan, Tudela, Misamis Occidental
Tudela Market Place and Bagsakan Center
Subanen Village, Tonggo, Namut, Tudela, Misamis Occidental

Government
The governance of the Municipality of Tudela was managed by elected, appointed and OIC Mayors from 1921 up to the present, as follows:

Infrastructure

Transportation

Air Tudela is accessible by plane and served by Ozamiz City Airport, a short ride of tricycle from the airport to the Ozamiz City Integrated Bus Terminal (IBJT) also known as "Agora Terminal" where a Tudela modified public utility vehicle called "balik-balik" awaits and bound to Tudela.:

SeaServed by Port of Ozamiz City, then same as at the airport scenario which you have to ride a tricycle going to the Agora Terminal and another ride on a balik-balik bound for Tudela.:

Land The public mode of transportation within this municipality is usually by tricycle and habal-habal, while the balik-balik is a means of transport to and fro Ozamiz City, the nearest city.:

Utilities

Communication Telecommunications and internet are available. Mobile phone networks (Smart, Globe, Sun Cellular (now part of Smart) and Dito Telecommunity) operate extensively in the municipality.:

PhilPost has its office in the Municipal Hall. Most of the municipality is serviceable by commercial couriers (e.g. LBC, JRS Express, Air21, 2GO, etc.) based in Ozamiz City.

Electricity All 33 barangays were energized by Misamis Occidental II Electric Cooperative, Inc. (MOELCI II).:

WaterPoblacion area is served by Misamis Occidental Water District (MOWD). Rural barangays have their own water systems funded by the government.

Education

Preschool
Every barangay in the municipality has their own Day Care Center under the supervision of the Department of Social Welfare and Development.
San Isidro Academy Pre-school Department
Ozamiz Elementary School Pre-school Department
there are also church-operated pre-schools in the Poblacion.
 Tudela Liberty Baptist Christian School Pre-school Department

Elementary 

 Balon Elementary School
 Barra Elementary School
 Basirang Elementary School
 Bongabong Elementary School
 Cabol-Anonan Elementary School
 Camating Elementary School
 Colambutan Bajo Elementary School
 Sebac Elementary School
 Tudela Central Elementary School
 Tigdok Elementary School
 Tonggo Elementary School
 Upper Centro Elementary School

Secondary
 Tudela National Comprehensive High School.
 San Isidro Academy of Tudela Inc.
 Northwestern Mindanao Christian Colleges, Inc.. Founded as Northern Mindanao Academy in 1946.
 Colambotan Bajo National High School. The first public secondary school in the municipality.

References

External links
 [ Philippine Standard Geographic Code]
Philippine Census Information
Local Governance Performance Management System

Municipalities of Misamis Occidental
Populated places established in 1921
1921 establishments in the Philippines
Misamis Occidental